Ifodje Atakpamé is a Togolese football club based in Atakpamé. They play in the Togolese Second Division.

In 1990 the team has won the Togolese Championnat National.

Stadium
Their home stadium is Guanha Usdao Pesihu.

Achievements
Togolese Championnat National
Champions (1): 1990

Performance in CAF competitions
 African Cup of Champions Clubs: 1 appearance
1991 African Cup of Champions Clubs – First Round

References

External links

Team profile

Football clubs in Togo